John Hart (July 8, 1706 – October 30, 1777) was a militia officer during King George's War and the French and Indian War from the Province of New Hampshire.

Biography

John Hart was born in Dover, New Hampshire, to Mary Evans and Captain Samual Hart. He was married three times to Mary Dennett, Abigal Landale and Sara Savill. Hart served in the New Hampshire Militia during the capture of Fortress Louisbourg from the French in 1745 by a force made up of militia from the New England colonies supported by the Royal Navy and commanded by William Pepperrell.

During the French and Indian War John Hart was promoted to Colonel and commanded a battalion of the New Hampshire Provincial Regiment that was with General Jeffery Amhearst that again captured Fortress Louisbourg in 1758. Hart's Location, New Hampshire is named for Colonel John Hart; this land was granted to him for his service during the French and Indian War.

Colonel Hart died aged 71, at his house in Portsmouth, New Hampshire. In 1753 John Hart sold to the city of Portsmouth the land for the North Cemetery where William Whipple, John Langdon and John Hart himself are all buried.

1706 births
1777 deaths
People of New Hampshire in the French and Indian War
People from Portsmouth, New Hampshire
People of colonial New Hampshire
Burials in New Hampshire